Flamarion's tuco-tuco or the tuco-tuco of the dunes (Ctenomys flamarioni) is a rodent species of the family Ctenomyidae Its karyotype has 2n = 48 and FN = 50–78. found in coastal dunes of Rio Grande do Sul state, southern Brazil. The species is threatened by habitat loss due to dune removal and urbanization. It is named after Brazilian biologist Luiz Flamarion B. de Oliveira.

References

Mammals of Brazil
Tuco-tucos
Mammals described in 1981